Paolo Paoloni (24 July 1929 – 9 January 2019) was an Italian actor.

Biography 
A close friend of director Luciano Salce, Paoloni is best known for portraying the role of the Galactic Mega-director in the Fantozzi film saga. Despite being famous for taking part to several comedies, Paoloni took also part in some horror films such as Cannibal Holocaust.

He died on 9 January 2019, at the age of 89. In his final months, Paoloni became mute due to a vocal cord disease.

Selected filmography

 The Black Sheep (1968)
 Il Prof. Dott. Guido Tersilli, primario della clinica Villa Celeste, convenzionata con le mutue (1969)
 La ragazza del prete (1970)
 In the Name of the Italian People (1971)
 White Horses of Summer (1975)
 Fantozzi (1975)
 Il secondo tragico Fantozzi (1976)
 L'altra metà del cielo (1977)
 An Average Little Man (1977)
 Where Are You Going on Holiday? (1978)
 Dr. Jekyll Likes Them Hot (1979)
 The Precarious Bank Teller (1979)
 Cannibal Holocaust (1979)
 Tesoro mio (1979)
 Inferno (1980)
 Il Marchese del Grillo (1981)
 Vieni avanti cretino (1982)
 And the Ship Sails On (1983)
 Stradivari (1988)
 The Miser (1990)
 Stasera a casa di Alice (1990)
 Vacanze di Natale '90 (1990)
 Faccione (1991)
 Voices from Beyond (1991)
 Vacanze di Natale '91 (1991)
 Fantozzi in paradiso (1993)
 Chicken Park (1994)
 Fantozzi - Il ritorno (1996)
 Double Team (1997)
 Dirty Linen (1999)
 Fantozzi 2000 – La clonazione (1999)
 Winter (2002)
 Ripley's Game (2002)
 The Haunting of Helena (2012)
 Si accettano miracoli (2015)
 Blessed Madness (2018)

References

External links
 
 

1929 births
2019 deaths
Italian male film actors
20th-century Italian male actors
21st-century Italian male actors
People of Marchesan descent